Pellaea breweri is a species of fern known by the common name Brewer's cliffbrake. It is native to much of the Western United States. It grows in rocky habitat such as cliffs and mountain slopes.

Description
Pellaea breweri grows from a branching reddish-brown rhizome covered in hairlike scales. Each leaf is up to 20 or 25 centimeters long. It is composed of a shiny brown rachis lined with widely spaced leaflets. The thick, pale green leaflets vary in shape from lance-shaped to diamond, triangular, or spade-shaped, and are sometimes divided deeply into lobes, or into two smaller leaflets. The edges of each segment are rolled under. The sporangia are located under the edges.

External links
Jepson Manual Treatment - Pellaea breweri
USDA Plants Profile; Pellaea breweri
Flora of North America
Pellaea breweri - Photo gallery

breweri
Ferns of California
Ferns of the United States
Flora of the Sierra Nevada (United States)
Flora of the West Coast of the United States
Flora of the Western United States
Flora of the Northwestern United States
Flora of the Southwestern United States
Endemic flora of the United States